The film industry in Florida is one of the largest in the United States: in 2006, Florida ranked third in the U.S. for film production (after California and New York) based on revenue generated. However, more recent 2009-2010 data no longer show Florida among the top four states.

Production activity has been generally concentrated in two regions, South Florida and Central Florida (Orlando and Tampa). The South Florida region is famous for large projects like Jerry Bruckheimer's Bad Boys film series and Neal Moritz's 2 Fast 2 Furious. The Central Florida area has been featured in The Punisher, starring John Travolta, and Adam Sandler's The Waterboy.

The state of Florida has a long film history thanks to its year-round sunshine and moderate climate.  Film classics were filmed throughout the state, such as Moon Over Miami (1941) and Esther Williams' Easy to Love (1953).

Orlando
In the early 1990s Orlando experienced a great boom in film production. The construction of the Disney-MGM Studios and Universal Studios production facilities attracted many filmmakers to the area. Films like Ron Howard's Parenthood and syndicated television shows like The Adventures of Superboy led the pack. Soon, the Steven Spielberg series seaQuest DSV and Tom Hank's From the Earth to the Moon called Florida home. Nickelodeon Studios operated within Universal Studios Florida. During this period Orlando acquired the nickname "Hollywood East" because of its surging film industry.

Just as film production appeared to be on the decline in Florida, the phenomenal success of 1998's The Blair Witch Project led to another boom. While this film was filmed in Maryland, its director and entire crew were University of Central Florida film school graduates. This cult independent film has led to a new wave of film production for the area.

Celebrity residents
Florida is also the home of many famous actors.  Celebrity residents of Florida have included Burt Reynolds, Sylvester Stallone, John Travolta, Kelly Preston, Andy Garcia, Tom Cruise, Ron Palillo, Joe Jonas, Sophie Turner, Kaye Stevens, Michael Winslow, Larry Haines, Margaret Hayes, Roberta Haynes, Meinhardt Raabe, Jackie Gerlich, Hedy Lamarr, Susana Giménez, David Caruso, Christian Slater, Kenan Thompson, Vanilla Ice, Christian Daniel, Iggy Pop, Donna Summer, Oprah Winfrey, Margaret Kerry, Jerry Springer, Antonio Sabàto Jr., Gloria Estefan, Jackie Gleason, Richard Boone, Perry Como, David Winters, Herb Shriner, Jean Shepherd, Bob McFadden, Scott "Carrot Top" Thompson, Billy Connolly, Cody Burger, Mickey Kuhn, Bobby Breen, Peter Palmer, Ricou Browning,  Philip Michael Thomas, Eugene Levy, Barrie Ingham, Mike Douglas, Leslie Nielsen, Eddie Egan, Kirby Grant, Arlene Dahl, Patricia Dane, Norma Miller, Lili Damita, Martha O'Driscoll, Dixie Dunbar, June Preisser, Phyllis Thaxter, Vic Damone, Vaughn Monroe, Tom Fadden, Kimbo Slice, Dick Smothers, Rhonda Shear, Luke Halpin, Jay North, Dan White, Dennis Hoey, Freddie Bartholomew, George Hamilton, Gary Burghoff, Jo Ann Pflug, Steve Sipek, Arthur Metrano,  Dave Madden, David Cassidy, Davy Jones, Anthony Newley, Gayle Hunnicutt, Cindy Crawford, Gail Edwards, Enrique Iglesias, Phil Collins, Sofia Vergara, Hulk Hogan, Nick Hogan,  Randy Savage, Dave Bautista, John Cena, and Dwayne Johnson.  There are also quite a few successful film directors located in the state including Daniel Myrick, George Abbott, and Harry Revier.

Films shot in Florida

Feature films shot in North Florida (Pensacola, Navarre, Ocala, Jacksonville regions)
 Kruel (2014)
 The Year of Getting to Know Us (2008)
 Lonely Hearts (2006)
 Ruby in Paradise (1993)
 Doc Hollywood (1991)
 Brenda Starr (1989)
 Blood Rage (1987)
 Cross Creek (1983)
 Jaws 2 (1978)
 Night Moves (1975)
Tarzan and the Brown Prince (1972)
 Frogs (1972)
 Follow That Dream (1962)
 Revenge of the Creature (1955)
 Creature from the Black Lagoon (1954)
 Distant Drums (1951)
 The Yearling (1946)

Feature films shot in Central Florida (Orlando/Tampa region)

After Midnight (2019)
Crawl (2019)
The Florida Project (2017)
Monty Comes Back (2016)
Spring Breakers (2013)
Tomorrowland (2015)
Charlie (2013) 
Letters to God (2010)
RoboDoc (2008)
Never Back Down (2008)
Bring It On: All or Nothing (2007)
Bring It On In It To Win It (2007)
Sydney White (2007)
Loren Cass (2006)
Larry the Cable Guy (2006)
Altered (2006)
The Punisher (2004)
Monster (2003)
Florida City (2003)
Ocean's Eleven (2001)
Olive Juice (2001)
Held for Ransom (2000)
Alligator Alley (2000)
Walking Across Egypt (1999)
Instinct (1999)
Deuce Bigalow: Male Gigolo (1999)
The Waterboy (1998)
Rosewood (1997)
Ulee's Gold (1997)
Trekkies (1997)
Marvin's Room (1996)
Apollo 13 (1995)
Cop and a Half (1993)
Lethal Weapon 3 (1992)
Passenger 57 (1992)
Problem Child 2 (1991)
Edward Scissorhands (1990)
Quick Change (1990)
Days of Thunder (1990)
Parenthood (1989)
Ernest Saves Christmas (1989)
Cocoon (1985)
D.A.R.Y.L. (1985)
Jaws 3-D (1983)
Ghost Story (1981)
Honky Tonk Freeway (1981)
Moonraker (1979)
Treasure of Matecumbe (1976)
Deathdream (1974)
Johnny Tiger (1966)
Two Thousand Maniacs! (1964)
Easy to Love (1953)
Beneath the 12-Mile Reef (1953)
 The Greatest Show on Earth (1952)
Neptune's Daughter (1949)
Mr. Peabody and the Mermaid (1948)
On an Island with You (1948)

Feature films shot in South Florida (Miami region)

Waves (2019)
Moonlight (2016)
Pain and Gain (2013)
Iron Man 3 (2013)
Marley and Me (2008)
Miami Vice (2006)
Transporter 2 (2005)
Red Eye (2005)
Meet the Fockers (2004)
Stuck on You (2003)
Bad Boys II (2003)
Out of Time (2003)
2 Fast 2 Furious (2003)
Wild Things (1998)
There's Something About Mary (1997)
The Birdcage (1996)
Bad Boys (1995)
Fair Game (1995)
Get Shorty (1995)
Just Cause (1995)
The Specialist (1994)
Drop Zone (1994)
Ace Ventura: Pet Detective (1994)
Salt on Our Skin (1992)
Miami Blues (1990)
Licence to Kill (1989)
Married to the Mob (1988)
Flight of the Navigator (1986)
The Mean Season (1985)
Monster Shark (1984)
Harry & Son (1984)
Scarface (1983)
Body Heat (1981)
 Eyes of a Stranger (1981)
The Dogs of War (1980)
Caddyshack (1980)
Empire of the Ants (1978)
Black Sunday (1977)
The Godfather Part II (1974)
Salty (1973)
Case of the Full Moon Murders (1973)
Little Laura and Big John (1973)
The Filthiest Show in Town (1972)
How Do I Love Thee? (1970)
Gentle Giant (1967)
Tony Rome (1967)
The Fat Spy (1966)
Thunderball (1965)
Girl Happy (1965)
Goldfinger (1964)
Safe at Home! (1962)
Where the Boys Are (1960)
The Bellboy (1960)
Wind Across the Everglades (1958)
Beneath the 12-Mile Reef (1953)
Seminole (1953)
Key Largo (1948)
Moon Over Miami (1941)

Documentary films shot in Florida
Vernon, Florida (1981)
Gates of Heaven (1980)

TV shows shot in Florida

Florida-based narrative TV series

 The Adventures of Superboy (1988-1990)
 Bloodline (2015-2017)
 Burn Notice (2007-2013)
 Flipper (1964-1967)
 The Glades (2010-2013)
 Miami Vice (1984-1990)
 Mortal Kombat: Conquest (1998)
 Seaquest DSV (1993-1995)
 South Beach Tow (2011-2014)
 Super Force (1989-1990)
 Swamp Thing (1990)
 Thunder in Paradise (1994)

Florida-based documentary/reality shows and independent shorts

 Carpocolypse (2005 sports reality show)
 The Chad Effect (2001 independent short)
 Dr. G: Inside the Caylee Anthony Case (2012 documentary TV special)
 Dr G Medical Examiner (2004- docu-drama)
 Gainesville (2015- reality show)
 Garriage: A Documentary in 4 Chapters and an Epilogue (2004 documentary)
 Hogan Knows Best (2005- reality show)
 Making The Band (2000 reality show)
 On Being Your Average Joe (2005 independent short)
 The Paper Route (1999 independent short)
 Skating's Next Star (2006 competition reality show)
 WWF: Raw Is War (1997 sports show)
 How to Do Florida (2010 - present)

Film festivals hosted in Florida

American Black Film Festival
Central Florida Film and Video Festival
Florida Film Festival
Fort Lauderdale International Film Festival (and its subsidiary Jury Award)
 Gasparilla International Film Festival (GIFF) (Tampa Bay)
Hispanic Film Festival of Miami
The Humphrey Bogart Film Festival
 India International Film Festival (IIFF) of Tampa Bay
Jacksonville Film Festival
L-DUB Film Festival (Lake Worth Playhouse)
Miami International Film Festival
Miami Short Film Festival
Palm Beach International Film Fest
Sarasota Film Festival
Tallahassee Film Festival

Film commissions and offices
Film in Florida - official site of Governor's Office of Film and Entertainment
Metro Orlando Film Office
Miami-Dade Film Office
Polk County Film Office
Space Coast Film Commission
Palm Beach County Film and Television Commission

Orlando
Metro Orlando alone is home to more than 10 state-of-the-art sound stages, making it one of the largest working production facility centers outside of Los Angeles and New York.

Adrenaline Films
Green Slate Studios

South Florida
Broadcast Beat Studios - Fort Lauderdale

See also
 Cinema of the United States
 Cinema of the world
 Florida Film Critics Circle

References

External links
Florida Film Commission
Metro Orlando Film Commission
Film Florida

Cinema of Florida
Florida
Florida